Hibiscus macropodus is a species of flowering plant in the family Malvaceae. It is found only in Yemen.

References

macropodus
Endemic flora of Socotra
Data deficient plants
Taxonomy articles created by Polbot